Vladislav Klimovich or Uladzislau Klimovich (born 12 June 1996) is a Belarusian professional footballer who plays for Nea Salamina.

Honours
BATE Borisov
Belarusian Premier League: 2014
Belarusian Super Cup: 2015

Jelgava
Latvian Football Cup: 2015–16

References

External links
 
 
 Profile at BATE website
 Official profile at UEFA

1996 births
Living people
Footballers from Minsk
Association football forwards
Belarusian footballers
Belarus international footballers
Belarusian expatriate footballers
Expatriate footballers in Latvia
Expatriate footballers in Hungary
Expatriate footballers in Cyprus
FC BATE Borisov players
FC Isloch Minsk Raion players
FK Jelgava players
FC Neman Grodno players
FC Torpedo-BelAZ Zhodino players
FC Dinamo Minsk players
Gyirmót FC Győr players
Nea Salamis Famagusta FC players